The J.W. Graham Medal in Computing and Innovation is an award given annually by the University of Waterloo and the University of Waterloo Faculty of Mathematics  to "recognize the leadership and many innovative contributions made to the University of Waterloo, and to the Canadian computer industry." Recipients of this award receive a gold medal and certificate.  Recipients are graduates of the University of Waterloo Faculty of Mathematics from business, education, or government.

The medal was established in 1994 to recognize Canadian computer industry veteran James Wesley Graham (known as "Wes Graham"). Graham was born in Copper Cliff, Ontario on January 17, 1932. He enrolled in the University of Toronto in 1950, and graduated with a BA in Mathematics and Physics in 1954, and an MA in Mathematics in 1955. He worked as a systems engineer for IBM in Canada, and then joined the faculty of the University of Waterloo in 1959. A team of his students developed the WATFOR series of compilers starting in 1965. He formed a computer science research group, known as the "Computer Systems Group," to distribute and maintain the software, and was also responsible for several spin-off organizations, including Watcom in 1981. He was made a member of the Order of Canada in April 1999. He died later that year on August 23, 1999. In 2001 his papers formed the start of the  J. Wesley Graham History of Computer Science Research Collection at the University of Waterloo library.

Recipients
The following people have received the J. W. Graham Medal:

 1995 - Ian McPhee
 1996 - William Reeves
 1997 - James G. Mitchell
 1998 - Dan Dodge
 1999 - Kim Davidson
 2000 - Paul Van Oorschot
 2001 - Terry Stepien
 2002 - Peter Savich
 2003 - F. David Boswell
 2004 - David P. Yach
 2005 - Garth A. Gibson
 2006 - Deanne Farrar
 2007 - Ricardo Baeza-Yates
 2008 - Eric Veach
 2009 - Craig Eisler
 2010 - Steven Woods
 2011 - Zack Urlocker
 2012 - Stephen M. Watt
 2013 - Jay Steele
 2014 - Jeromy Carriere
 2015 - Tom Duff
 2016 - Tas Tsonis
 2017 - Vicki Iverson
 2018 - Alex Nicolaou
 2019 - Eldon Sprickerhoff

See also 

 List of computer science awards
 Prizes named after people

References

University of Waterloo
Computer science awards
Information science awards
1994 establishments in Ontario